LoopNet is an online marketplace for commercial property, primarily providing commercial property listings for sale and for lease in the United States and is currently owned by commercial property data company CoStar Group.

History
LoopNet was founded in 1995 by Dennis DeAndre. Working alongside engineer Steve Midgley, the two built LoopNet into the internet's largest commercial real estate listing service. LoopNet underwent three rounds of private venture capital financing in 1997 (Indo Suez), 1998 (Trinity Capital & Partners) and $20 million in 1999 from fourT5 real estate brokers.

LoopNet was an early venture in Internet-based user-created content. As early as October 1996 virtually all of its commercial property listings were being entered by its users directly. Over time, LoopNet added the capability to import listings in an automated manner. 

In 2001, the company merged with PropertyFirst.com.

In June 2006, the company became a public company via an initial public offering. At that time, the company had 360,000 commercial properties for sale or lease.

LoopNet acquired BizBuySell (2004), CityFeet (2007), REApps (2008), Land & Farm/Lands of America (2008) and Bizquest (2010).

In April 2012, CoStar Group acquired LoopNet for approximately $860 million in cash and stock.

In 2014, the company settled a trademark infringement lawsuit that it brought against Dotloop.

In 2020, to address rapid changes occurring in the COVID-19 commercial real estate market, the company added significant virtual tour capabilities.

Business
Loopnet connects sellers with buyers over an open and free network. As of April 2022, LoopNet had more than 8 million registered members and over 11 million unique monthly visitors.

LoopNet's business model involves selling memberships to its site. Paid or Premium Membership confers additional benefits.

Legal issues
In CoStar Group, Inc. v. LoopNet, Inc. (2006), in which Loopnet prevailed, it was determined that Loopnet, as an operator of a website, was no different from Netcom, then an internet service provider, and was not responsible for copyright infringements by its users. This ruling established precedent for copyright liability protection for many websites. It followed the Religious Technology Center v. Netcom case (better known as Scientology vs. the Internet). LoopNet demonstrated that it policed any user violations after the fact. The court did not require the company to stop future violations before they occur. Such a ruling could have effectively shut down LoopNet's website as well as those of many application service providers. CoStar unsuccessfully argued that LoopNet was an active party to the violations and thereby guilty of copyright infringement.

References

External links
 

2006 initial public offerings
2012 mergers and acquisitions
Companies based in San Francisco
Online real estate databases
Real estate companies established in 1995
Real estate services companies of the United States